Slant four or Slant-4 was a name given to several unrelated engines produced by different manufacturers. These were all in-line four-cylinder engines with cylinders inclined from vertical. They include:
 Vauxhall Slant-4 engine (a planned V8 version never materialized)
 Triumph Slant-4 engine (4-cylinder variant of Triumph V8)
 Saab B engine (a version of the Triumph Slant-4 engine built by Saab with modifications)
 Saab H engine (a redesigned Saab B engine built by Saab)

Other inline four-cylinder engines with a similar layout but without the official name, include: 
 Pontiac Trophy 4 engine (4-cylinder variant of Pontiac V8 engine)
 International Harvester Comanche 4 (4-cylinder variant of International Harvester Comanche V8)
 Lotus 900 series (a planned production V8 never materialized, but did appear in the Lotus Etna concept car)
 Hillman Imp engine
 Volvo Redblock Engine

Piston engine configurations
Slant engines